The shortspire hornsnail, scientific name Pleurocera curta, is a species of freshwater snail with an operculum, an aquatic gastropod mollusk in the family Pleuroceridae. This species is endemic to the United States.

References 

Molluscs of the United States
Pleuroceridae
Taxa named by Samuel Stehman Haldeman
Taxonomy articles created by Polbot